SC-ESV Parndorf 1919 is an Austrian association football club from Parndorf. They currently play in the Austrian Regional League East.

Current squad

External links

Official site
Supporter site

 
Association football clubs established in 1919
SC-ESV Parndorf 1919
Football clubs in Austria